Waverley Spencer Ivey (March 11, 1861 – September 28, 1938) was an American farmer and politician who served in the Virginia House of Delegates.

References

External links 

1861 births
1938 deaths
Members of the Virginia House of Delegates
20th-century American politicians